Nymphicula nigristriata is a moth in the family Crambidae. It was described by George Hampson in 1917. It is found on New Guinea and in the Solomon Islands.

The wingspan is 11–14 mm. The forewings are suffused with brown in the basal two-thirds. The base is brown mixed with ochreous and the antemedian fascia is yellow. The median area is scattered with dark brown scales. The base of the hindwings is brown with a white subbasal fascia and a silver grey tornal spot, as well as a yellow streak.

References

Nymphicula
Moths described in 1917